Clovis High School is a four-year high school founded in 1899.   The school's current campus, located at 1055 Fowler Avenue in Clovis, California, United States, opened in 1969.

History

From the book, Images of an Age: "Community members tried unsuccessfully to form a high school district as early as 1889. At the time, families sent their sons to Santa Clara or Stockton to schools beyond eighth grade. Daughters went to San Jose, if they went at all. Then, on June 6, 1899, Lee Beal, a Jefferson Colony Farmer, and John Rutledge, a Clovis millman, led seven school districts to join in formation of one high school district. Each of the seven elected one trustee to the board. The school was named Clovis High School, although it was the union of Red Banks, Jefferson Colony, Garfield Colony, Mississippi Settlement, Wolters Colony, Temperance Colony, and Clovis.
Seventeen high school students enrolled in classes at the Clovis school. Louis K. Webb, principal and teacher, received $120 per month. Estelle Kellogg joined the staff in September. Two students, Emory Reyburn and R.E.L. Browne, graduated in the first class of 1902. A separate Clovis High School was financed by bonds in 1903, east of the railroad track between Fourth and Fifth Streets. It was replaced in 1918."

In 1920, Clovis High School moved into new facilities on Fifth Street built by William Weeks.  The High School remained in that building until 1969, when it moved to its current facilities on Fowler Avenue. The building on Fifth Street gradually fell into a state of disrepair, despite its historical significance for the Clovis Community.  This unique building had churrigueresque arches which were patterned after the detailed baroque architecture of Spain in the late 17th and early 18th centuries. These arches were taken down by State mandate after the 1952 Kern County earthquake for safety reasons.  In 1995, San Joaquin College of Law met with city leaders and negotiated a deal to bring the Law School, which was founded in 1969, to Clovis from its Fresno site. This resulted in a multimillion-dollar renovation which not only preserved the historic exterior of the building, but also preserved and reclaimed many of its unique and historic interior features.

Statistics

In the 2006–07 school year, Clovis High School had an enrollment of 2,518, which has probably increased, and an average class size between 22 and 33 people.

The graduation rate in 2005–06 was 94.4%.

In 2008, Clovis High's API rating increased to 803, and has set a goal of gaining 10 more points to reach an API of 813.

Campus and facilities
The current Clovis High campus opened in 1969. Clovis High has a library media center, choir and lecture halls, and a drama room built like a small black-box theater.
Clovis High School has two gymnasiums, tennis courts (resurfaced in 2019), an aquatics center, baseball field (Merriman Field), and Lamonica Stadium, which is shared with Clovis East High School.
Clovis High's Aquatics Center was dedicated to former coach and teacher Jim Coiner on November 5, 2008.

Clovis High School's facilities are 47 years old. When asked to grade how well the buildings and grounds are maintained at their child's school, 78% of parents rated the grounds as “good” to “excellent”.

The campus is relatively technologically advanced, with a total of 349 computers, not all of which are available to students (most student-used computers are housed in the library and the computer lab), and 121 classrooms with internet.

Recently, CHS was awarded a Career Technical Grant to create a construction careers pathway and new facilities.

Staff
The current principal at Clovis High School is Stephanie Hanks.

Academics

Clovis High School offers 13 Advanced Placement courses, as well as a variety of core and elective classes.

Athletics

Clovis High School is a part of the TRAC, or Tri-River Athletic Conference

-Girls water polo has won 4 Valley titles, with the most recent coming in 2015. Meanwhile, the boys water polo team has won 3 section championships.

Baseball coach James Patrick celebrated his 500th career coaching win in 2008, as well as going 33-5 in 2014 and winning the CIF D-I Team of the Year.

Extracurricular and co-curricular activities

Clovis High students participate in a number of co-curricular activities, such as Science Fair, Science Olympiad, History Day, Forensics, Academic Decathlon, and Mock Trial.
CHS also has a number of clubs. The majority of Clovis High's clubs meet rarely; however, among those extracurricularly active are the Interact Club, the Ecology club, and a number of others.

Clovis High also has an award-winning drama department, a dance repertory, and an active student leadership program.

Clovis High has multiple orchestras, two jazz bands, multiple concert bands, an indoor percussion ensemble, and a marching band. In 1983, the marching band traveled to Whitewater, Wisconsin and won second place in the Bands of America Grand National Championship, missing first place in the nation by only one-tenth of a point. The band also traveled to Washington, DC for the annual Cherry Blossom Festival in 1977,  and was one of only two high school bands chosen to march in Ronald Reagan's inaugural parade in January 1981. The marching band also performed in the 1984 Tournament of Roses Parade. In 2015 and 2016, the Clovis High Indoor Percussion Ensemble traveled to Dayton, Ohio to participate in the Winter Guard International World Championships. Clovis High also has numerous choirs.

Clovis High's Odyssey of the Mind team won 6th place in the world competition in 1989 and in 2002 won 10th place in the Destination Imagination (changed from Odyssey of the Mind) in the Global Competition.

Publications

The Cougar's Growl, Clovis High's student-produced newspaper, comes out eight times a year, and has won the International First Place Award in the Quill and Scroll News Media Evaluation, 2007–2008.

The Cavalcade is Clovis High School's student-produced yearbook, and has existed for almost 100 years.

Notable alumni

 Ryan Beatty, singer-songwriter, collaborated with Tyler, the Creator, and BROCKHAMPTON
 Mike Briggs, Fresno City Councilmember, state legislator, talk show host
 Tyler Clutts, pro football player for the Dallas Cowboys
 Ryan Cook, professional baseball player for the Boston Red Sox
 Johnny Estrada, all-star, pro baseball player
 Zack Follett, professional football player
 Mark Gardner, pro baseball player, bullpen coach for the San Francisco Giants
 Aaron Hill, TV and movie actor 
 Ryan Kenny, pro soccer player
 Daryle Lamonica, NFL Raiders quarterback (lived in Fresno while attending Clovis High)
 Dave Lewis, pro football player
 Chad McCarty, pro soccer player, Olympian
 Lloyd Merriman, professional baseball player
 Keith Poole, pro football player
 Jenna Prandini, USA Olympian, sprinting 
 Gio Scelzi, racecar driver
 Kate Scott, sportscaster, play-by-play announcer for the Philadelphia 76ers
 Stephen Spach, pro football player for the St. Louis Rams
 Matt Spaeth, pro football player
 Damon Thomas, pro football player

Faculty, staff, or administrators
 Jim Criner, college football coach
 Steve Wapnick, pro baseball player
 Dick Selma, pro baseball player

References

External links
Official website

Educational institutions established in 1899
High schools in Fresno County, California
Public high schools in California
1899 establishments in California